Blanche is the surname of:

August Blanche (1811–1868), Swedish journalist, novelist and socialist politician
Bartolomé Blanche (1879–1970), Chilean brigadier general, briefly provisional president of Chile in 1932
Francis Blanche (1921–1974), French actor and humorist
Fred A. Blanche Jr. (1921–1997), Justice of the Louisiana Supreme Court 
Jacques-Émile Blanche (1861–1942), French artist
John Blanche (fl. 1950s–2010s), illustrator
Margot Blanche (born 1983), pop singer
Roland Blanche (1943–1999), French actor

See also
Blanche (given name)